Maud of Boulogne (Matilda of Boulogne) may refer to:

Matilda of Leuven, countess consort of Boulogne as wife of Eustace I of Boulogne
Matilda I of Boulogne, great-granddaughter of the previous, was reigning countess and queen consort of England, as wife of king Stephen
Mathilde of Flanders, her granddaughter, was duchess consort of Brabant as first wife of Henry I, Duke of Brabant
Matilda II of Boulogne, great-granddaughter of Matilda I and niece of duchess of Brabant, countess and briefly queen consort of Portugal, wife of Afonso III